Ukrainian Russian may refer to:
 Russians in Ukraine
 Russian language in Ukraine
 Ukrainians in Russia